Karamadai is located near Mettupalayam, a Neighborhood of Mettupalayam, Coimbatore in the Indian state of Tamil Nadu. It is located on Coimbatore - Ooty NH 67. Nearby places are Teachers colony, Press Colony, Jodhipuram and Periyanaickenpalayam. The Ranganathaswamy temple and Nanjundeswarar temple are the most prominent landmarks in the town. The place of Karamadai came into limelight due to the presence of ex-steel giant Sri Ramakrishna Steel Industries. Previously agricultural town became industrial due to the presence of Sri Ramakrishna Steel Industry.

Geography

Demographics
 India census, Karamadai is a Town Panchayat city in district of Coimbatore, Tamil Nadu. The Karamadai city is divided into 18 wards for which elections are held every 5 years. The Karamadai Town Panchayat has population of 35,166 of which 17,557 are males while 17,609 are females as per report released by Census India 2011.

Population of Children with age of 0-6 is 3,056 which is 8.69% of total population of Karamadai (TP). In Karamadai Town Panchayat, Female Sex Ratio is of 1,003 against state average of 996. Moreover, Child Sex Ratio in Karamadai is around 955 compared to Tamil Nadu state average of 943. Literacy rate of Karamadai city is 84.62% higher than state average of 80.09%. In Karamadai, Male literacy is around 89.04% while female literacy rate is 80.23%.

Manjur Ghat
Route: Karamadai-Geddai-Manjur-Ooty

This is a smaller ghat for local Coimbatore city traffic towards Ooty, and is used as a backup road on the rare occasions that both the Coonoor Ghat and the Kotagiri Ghat are closed. The road is narrow with many hairpin bends. From Manjur, at the top of the ghat, the distance is equidistant to either Ooty or Coonoor via smaller district roads.

Religion
Every year 'Masimagam' car festival is celebrated in February (in Tamil month Masi).

Nanjundeswarar temple is a Shiva temple built by Shaivites descendants of Chola clan. This temple holds minute art works portraying the Tamil heritage.

A New Vishnu temple, named "Then Thirumala -Thirupathi" was built in 2000 near Karamadai.

Attractions
As Karamadai  is just about 30 km from center of Coimbatore city towards northern direction, it is also an easy destination spot located at an easily reachable distance for the people of Mettupalayam, Tirupur, Ooty etc. The Ranganathar temple in Karamadai is located at the center of the town.

A village called Onnipalayam (3 kilometers away from Karamadai) is also getting popular because of its natural environment of Karadu malai and nearby agricultural lands. The Super Star Rajni movie "Bhairavi" shot their climax sequences in this village.

Agriculture is the main activity in and around Karamadai. The farmers' market is held every Friday. 

And Karamadai acts as Clothing Hub of Coimbatore, Clothing Shops reached people with different collections are Platform clothing and Trendee Clothing.

See also
 Nanjundeswarar temple, Karamadai

References

Cities and towns in Coimbatore district